Taedongmoon Cinema is a movie theater located in Sungri Street, Chung-guyok, Pyongyang, North Korea. The cinema is located near the Taedong River.

Taedongmoon Cinema was built in 1955. Its architectural style is that of retro; faux ancient Greek columns line its facade. Originally it had only a single screen, but since renovations to the interior in 2008, there have been two.

It is considered the most important cinema of Pyongyang and serves as the flagship cinema for domestic film screenings. Occasionally, when foreign films are screened, the screening is for an invited audience only with no access by the general public. It is also used for screenings of the Pyongyang International Film Festival.

See also
Cinema of North Korea
International Cinema Hall
Taedongmun

References

Works cited

Buildings and structures in Pyongyang
Cinemas and movie theaters
Theatres completed in 1955
1955 establishments in North Korea
20th-century architecture in North Korea